Dominic Seiterle (born September 4, 1975) is a Canadian rower born in Montreal, Quebec. He is a 2008 Summer Olympics and World Rowing Championships gold medallist as a member of the 8+. He also won three gold medals at the 2007 World Rowing Cup regattas and gold at the 2007 Henley Royal Regatta. Previous to this, he was 2006 Canadian National Rowing Gold medallist in the single scull and came 13th at the 2000 Summer Olympics in the double sculls.

He won a gold medal at the 2008 Summer Olympics in the men's eights with Andrew Byrnes, Kyle Hamilton, Malcolm Howard, Adam Kreek, Kevin Light, Ben Rutledge, Jake Wetzel and cox Brian Price.

Dominic graduated from Dartmouth College in 1998 with a BA in Psychology and Environmental Studies.  In the summer of 1997, he was diagnosed with thyroid cancer, but he recovered to return to school and captained the heavyweight crew in his senior year.  Dominic learned to row at St. Andrew's School in Middletown, Delaware.

In 2005, Dominic completed his MBA in Competitive Business Strategy and Marketing at the William E. Simon Graduate School of Business Administration at the University of Rochester (Rochester, NY). While in New York and after his first year of graduate school, Dominic rowed across Lake Ontario to raise money for cancer research and children diagnosed with cancer.  The trip was 130 kilometers from Rochester, New York, to Kingston, Ontario and raised money for the J.P. Wilmot Cancer Center (at the University of Rochester Medical Center) and Camp Trillium (Ontario).

References

External links
 Slam! Sports profile
 Canadian Olympic Committee profile
 Profile at Rowing Canada

1975 births
Anglophone Quebec people 
Canadian male rowers
Dartmouth College alumni
Rowers from Montreal
Olympic rowers of Canada
Olympic gold medalists for Canada
Rowers at the 2000 Summer Olympics
Rowers at the 2008 Summer Olympics
Living people
Canadian people of German descent
University of Rochester alumni
Olympic medalists in rowing
Medalists at the 2008 Summer Olympics
World Rowing Championships medalists for Canada